Punjabi kabaddi, also called circle style kabaddi, is a contact sport that originated in the Punjab region, in the northern part of the Indian subcontinent. There are a number of traditional Punjabi kabaddi styles traditionally played in the Punjab region. As standard kabaddi, circle style kabaddi is also played at state and international levels, through various governing bodies such as Kabaddi World Cup (Circle style).

Name

Traditional Punjabi kabaddi styles

In  (/ਲੰਬੀ ਕੌਡੀ) there are 15 players with a circular pitch of 15–20 feet. There is no outer limit. The players can run as far they can. There is no referee. The raider will say "" throughout the attack.

(/ਸੌਂਚੀ ਕੌਡੀ) (also called Saunchi pakki/) can best be described as being similar to boxing. It is popular in the Malwa area of Punjab. It is unlimited players with a circular playing pitch. A bamboo with red cloth is dug into the ground which is paraded by the winner.

In sauchi kabaddi, the raider will hit the defender but only on the chest. The defender will then hold the raiders wrist. A foul is declared if any other part of the body is grabbed. If the defender holds the raiders wrist and restricts his movement, he will be declared the winner. If the raider loses the grip of the defender, then the raider will be the winner.

Goongi kabaddi
A popular style is Goongi kabaddi (/ਗੂੰਗੀ ਕਬੱਡੀ) (silent kabaddi) where a raider player does not speak and say the word kabaddi but just touches the opponent's team player and the whom he touches only that player will try to stop the player.  The struggle will continue till he reaches the starting line or acknowledge the defeat and loses a point, or if he safely reaches the starting line, he will get the point.

Other traditional styles
 Chhe handhi
 Shamiali wali
 
 
 Badhi
 Baithvi
 Burjia wali
 Ghorh kabaddi
 Daudhey
 Cheervi
 Chatta wali
 Dhair kabaddi popular in Majha area of Punjab
 Ambarsari
 Ferozpuri
 Lahori
 Multani
 Lyallpuri
 Bahwalpuri
 Ambalvi (.

Punjab Circle style

History and development
Kabaddi is the regional sport of the Punjab region and was referred to as Punjabi kabaddi in India and Pakistan. However, with the formation of the states of Haryana and Punjab in India, the same game was referred to as Punjab kabaddi and Haryana kabaddi. This caused confusion and therefore, in 1978, the Amateur Circle Kabaddi Federation of India was formed and the syle of kabaddi played in the Punjab region was named circle kabaddi.

Punjab circle kabaddi, also known as "diarey wali kabaddi" (/ਦਾੲਿਰੇ ਵਾਲੀ ਕਬੱਡੀ) incorporates the kabaddi styles of the Punjab region.

Rules
In the Punjab region, kabaddi is played on a circular pitch of a diameter of 22 meters and an inner circle with a line through the middle of the pitch: the pitch is called . There are two teams of 8 players; one on one raid; and no player leaves the field. If 2 stoppers attack a player, a foul is declared. Punjab style  does not require the raider saying "kabaddi, kabaddi" throughout the raid. The game lasts for 40 minutes with a change in sides after 20 minutes.

In the Punjab Circle Style form of Kabaddi, whenever any player is touched (out), he does not go out of the court, but stays inside, and one point is awarded to the team that touched him. This game is also played on a time basis, i.e. the time is 30 sec.

Notable competitions

Kabaddi World Cup
The circle style Kabaddi World Cup, is an international kabaddi competition administrated by the government of Punjab (India) contested by men's and women's national teams. The competition has been contested every year since the inaugural tournament in 2010, except for 2015 due to the 2015 Guru Granth Sahib desecration controversy. The women's tournament was introduced in 2012. The current Champion 2020 of Punjabi Kabaddi is Pakistan who won the final against India in February. 
.

Super Kabaddi League
Super Kabaddi League (SKL) is a professional-level kabaddi league in Pakistan. Its inaugural season was played from 1 to 10 May 2018 in Lahore. This league follows a city-based franchise model.[3] More than a 100 Kabaddi players from Pakistan and abroad were presented in the players' draft, which took place on 23 April 2018, in Lahore. International players from Sri Lanka, Iran, Bangladesh, and Malaysia participated in the inaugural edition.

Women's Kabaddi World Cup
The first Women's Kabaddi World Cup was held in Patna, India in 2012. India won the championship, defeating Iran in the finals. India retained the title in 2013, defeating debutants New Zealand in the finals.

Asian Kabaddi Cup
The Asia Kabaddi Cup has been held twice in consecutive years. The inaugural tournament was held in 2011 in Iran. In 2012, the Asia Kabaddi Cup was held in Lahore, Pakistan, from 1 to 5 November. In the 2012 ASIA Kabaddi Cup, Pakistan won against India with a technical win after the Indian team forfeited the match following a dispute.

UK Kabaddi Cup

Kabaddi received major recognition in the United Kingdom during the 2013 UK Kabaddi Cup. It featured the national kabaddi teams from India, England, Pakistan, the United States, Canada, and a local club team sponsored by SGPC. The UK Kabaddi Cup hosts the Punjab circle style of kabaddi.

World Kabaddi League
World Kabaddi League was formed in 2014. The league includes eight teams from four countries – Canada, England, Pakistan, and the United States – and plays the Punjabi circle style of kabaddi. Some of the teams are owned or part owned by actors – Akshay Kumar (Khalsa Warriors), Rajat Bedi (Punjab Thunder), Sonakshi Sinha (United Singhs) and Yo Yo Honey Singh (Yo Yo Tigers). The inaugural league season was played from August 2014 to December 2014. United Singhs (Birmingham, England) won the finals defeating Khalsa Warriors (London, England) in the first season.

Local tournaments
There are over 1,000 kabaddi tournaments held in Punjab, some of which include the following
 Rurka Kalan Kabaddi tournament
 Udham Singh Kabaddi Cup vill-Fattu Dhinga Dist-Kapurthala
 Baba Hastana Singh Kabaddi tournament vill-Khiranwali Dist-Kapurthala
 Hakimpur Kabaddi Games. (Hakimpur is a village in Nawanshahr District)
 Mothada Kalan Kabaddi tournament.
 Sant Maharaj Ishar Singh Ji Rara Sahib Kabaddi tournament
 Sant baba ram saroop kabaddi cup pind pipli  and distt faridkot Punjab
 Gholia kalan kabaddi cup, moga
 Badowal kabaddi cup, ludhiana
 Dirba kabaddi cup (Babbu maan)

See also
 India national kabaddi team
 Kabaddi at the Asian Games
 Kho kho
 Tag
 Kabaddi Cup 2013
 Sports in Punjab, India

References

External links
 Amateur Circle Kabaddi Federation of India 

Kabaddi
Team sports
Punjab
Traditional sports of India
Sports originating in South Asia